The discography of Keane, a British alternative rock band, contains five studio albums, two live albums, ten extended plays and 28 singles.

Albums

Studio albums

Live albums

Compilation albums

Extended plays

Singles

Other charted songs

Video albums

Music videos

Songs in other media

Notes

References

External links
Keane official page

Keane (band)
Discographies of British artists
Rock music group discographies